Hiram Barber (January 25, 1800 – October 23, 1888) was an American pioneer, politician, and businessman in Dodge County, Wisconsin.

Biography
Born in Hebron, New York, Barber taught school and was a merchant. He studied law and was admitted to the New York bar. In 1829, Barber was appointed county judge for Warren County, New York, by Governor Martin Van Buren.  He remained in this office until his resignation in 1844.

In 1844, Barber moved to the Wisconsin Territory and settled in Horicon, where he had agriculture, manufacture, and railroad business interests. Barber served in the first Wisconsin Constitutional Convention of 1846.

In the run-up to the first Wisconsin gubernatorial election, Barber became a candidate for Governor of Wisconsin, but at the 1848 Wisconsin Democratic Party Convention he lost the nomination to Nelson Dewey.  After becoming Governor, Dewey would appoint Barber to the Board of Regents tasked with organizing the University of Wisconsin.

Later that year, Barber ran for and was elected to represent Dodge County's 2nd district in the 1849 session of the Wisconsin State Assembly.

In 1876, Barber ran for the United States House of Representatives as a Republican in the 5th district, but was defeated by Samuel D. Burchard.

His son was Hiram Barber, Jr., who served in the United States House of Representatives from Illinois.  Barber died in Horicon, Wisconsin, in 1888.

Notes

1800 births
1888 deaths
People from Hebron, New York
People from Horicon, Wisconsin
New York (state) lawyers
Wisconsin lawyers
Businesspeople from New York (state)
Businesspeople from Wisconsin
New York (state) state court judges
Members of the Wisconsin State Assembly
People from Warren County, New York
19th-century American politicians
19th-century American businesspeople
19th-century American judges
19th-century American lawyers
People from Dodge County, Wisconsin